Yukio Tsuda may refer to:

Yukio Tsuda (footballer), Japanese footballer
Yukio Tsuda (professor), Japanese professor